St.Thomas English Medium Higher Secondary School is a secondary school in Attappallam, Kumily, India.It was founded in 1978 by St. Thomas Forane Church, Attappallam, under the Syro-Malabar Catholic Diocese of Kanjirappally. English is the language of instruction. Malayalam and Hindi are additional languages.

The school gives education from kindergarten level to higher secondary level. The founders of the school set before themselves the task of providing ideal information to the pupils by fostering in their minds an ardent faith in God, love for their fellow men and true patriotism. These aims are to be realized by imparting moral instruction in addition to general intellectual and physical education irrespective of caste, creed, religion or language, they also made it their mission to spread rays of learning all around.

External links
St. Thomas English Medium Higher Secondary School

References

Christian schools in Kerala
Primary schools in Kerala
High schools and secondary schools in Kerala
Schools in Idukki district
Educational institutions established in 1978
1978 establishments in Kerala